Bắc Tân Uyên (North Tân Uyên) is a rural district of Bình Dương province in the Southeast region of Vietnam. It was established on December 29, 2013.

Administrative divisions
Bắc Tân Uyên is divided into 1 town and 9 rural communes:
 Tân Thành town
 Tân Bình
 Bình Mỹ
 Tân Lập
 Tân Định
 Lạc An
 Hiếu Liêm
 Đất Cuốc
 Thường Tân
 Tân Mỹ

References

Districts of Bình Dương province